VOA is the eighth studio album by American rock musician Sammy Hagar, released on July 23, 1984 by Geffen Records. 

In 1985, Hagar joined Van Halen and VOA was his last solo album until 1987's I Never Said Goodbye. The title is a reference to the Voice of America broadcast network.

The album features the single "I Can't Drive 55", Hagar's most successful song as a solo artist. The album peaked at number 32 on the Billboard 200 album charts on December 15, 1984.

Background and recording

The album was recorded at Fantasy Recording in Berkeley, California and Sunset Sound in Hollywood, and then mixed at The Power Station in New York.

According to the album's liner notes, "Burnin' Down the City" is inspired by the street artists of New York City.

Track listing

Personnel
Sammy Hagar – lead vocals, lead guitar
Gary Pihl – rhythm guitar, backing vocals
Jesse Harms – keyboards, backing vocals
Bill Church – bass guitar, backing vocals
David Lauser – drums, backing vocals
Ted "Champagne" Templeman – percussion

Production
Ted Templeman – producer
Jeff Hendrickson – engineer
Tom Size – assistant engineer
Gary Rindfuss – assistant engineer
Eric Mohler – assistant engineer
Terry Christian – assistant engineer

Chart positions
Album

Singles

Certifications

References

Further reading

External links
 Lyrics from Hagar's official web site

Sammy Hagar albums
1984 albums
Albums produced by Ted Templeman
Geffen Records albums
Warner Records albums